Charles Angas Hurst AM DSc FAA (22 September 1923 – 19 October 2011) was an Australian mathematical physicist noted for his work in lattice models, quantum field theory, asymptotic expansions and Lie groups. He was appointed a Member of the Order of Australia in 2003, elected a Fellow of the Australian Academy of Science in 1972, and awarded the Centenary Medal and an Hon DSc (Melb).  His PhD was a seminal work on quantum field theory, developing asymptotic expansions for perturbation expansions. In 1952 Hurst represented Australia in the inaugural International Mathematical Union.

Hurst's work with Herbert Green on lattice problems and the Ising model led to the Free fermion field model, which contained all known properties of Fermions at the time of its publication.  Hurst's work with Thirring (Thirring model) found the simplest non-linear field and is still used as a test model for perturbation theory.

References

External links
Hurst's mathematical genealogy
chemphys.adelaide.edu.au
Interviews with Scientists
Trove
Obituary, austms.org.au
Encyclopedia of Australian Science

Australian mathematicians
1923 births
Fellows of the Australian Academy of Science
2011 deaths
Members of the Order of Australia
Recipients of the Centenary Medal